Ectoedemia heringi is a moth of the family Nepticulidae. It is found from southern Great Britain to Poland and further east to central Russia.

The wingspan is 4.2-5.3 mm. Adults are on wing in May in the south and in June and July more in the north. There is one generation per year.

The larvae feed on Castanea sativa, Quercus faginea, Quercus macrolepis, Quercus petraea, Quercus pubescens and Quercus robur. They mine the leaves of their host plant. The mine consists of a narrow corridor with a broad frass line, running along a vein. Normally, the corridor runs along the midrib. It may also run along a lateral vein, in which case the direction usually is towards the midrib. The corridor widens into a blotch laying against the midrib. Pupation takes place outside of the mine.

The name honours the German entomologist Erich Martin Hering.

External links
Fauna Europaea
bladmineerders.nl
 Ectoedemia heringi images at  Consortium for the Barcode of Life
 Ectoedemia heringi at UKMoths
A Taxonomic Revision Of The Western Palaearctic Species Of The Subgenera Zimmermannia Hering And Ectoedemia Busck s.str. (Lepidoptera, Nepticulidae), With Notes On Their Phylogeny

Nepticulidae
Moths of Europe
Moths described in 1934